Public displays of affection (PDA) are acts of physical intimacy in the view of others. What is an acceptable display of affection varies with respect to culture and context.

Some organizations have rules limiting or prohibiting public displays of affection. Displays of affection in a public place, such as the street, are more likely to be objected to, than similar practices in a private place with only people from a similar cultural background present.

Physical affection has been defined as "any touch intended to arouse feelings of love in the giver and/or the recipient."

Worldwide

Religiosity
Religiosity is one important factor that influences how romantic relationships develop in other countries. Higher levels of religiosity are not directly related to the number of partners reported by the respondents. However, religious respondents report lower levels of intimate contact with their partners. It is apparent that religiosity limits the level of expression of affection in general. Also, religion is related to more conservative values that may have a global effect on all levels of PDA by younger participants.
Seemingly religiosity may work in two different ways where religious communities are in general quite racially segregated around the world, and people with strong religious beliefs may be very unlikely to engage in sexual activity or even to date someone due to the morals advised by their religion. In many regions of the world, religion drives the cultural view on PDA and this sometimes culminates into proscription based on religious rules, for example sharia law, Catholic and Evangelical virginity pledge, Anabaptist plain people, Methodist outward holiness, Quaker testimony of simplicity, Latter-day Saint Law of chastity, Judaic Tzniut, etc. The conservative Islamic schools of thought, especially Salafism-oriented ones forbid public displays of affection.

Western world

In most of the Western world, such as Western Europe, Australia, New Zealand, Canada, the United States, and Latin America, it is very common to see people holding hands, hugging and sometimes kissing in public. It is not usually socially acceptable to be overly explicit, such as engaging in sexual activities. Kissing is more commonly seen in adult night-life, such as nightclubs.

China 
Historically, the Chinese have regarded most to all physical contact between opposite sex as unacceptable. The earliest iconic record of such view is Mencius: Li Lou I (孟子 · 離婁上, written in the Warring States Period), in which Mencius (Chinese: 孟子; pinyin: mèngzǐ), a Confucian scholar and philosopher, states “It is the etiquette that males and females shall not allow their hands to touch in giving or receiving anything." The exact quote writes「男女授受不親」 and is still widely used until this day. Open-minded young generations in more developed parts of China are more unafraid of displaying their affections towards their partners in public (partially affected by the emergence of western culture.) It is common to see males and females holding hands or wear coordinating outfits in urbanized cities. "Simply observing the sheer mass availability of condoms and hyper-sexualized advertisements and may attest to China’s increasing acceptance of Public Displays of Affection." However, China is a developing nation nonetheless, meaning traditional ideals still have a strong influence on social norms of relatively remote regions.

Following the rise of social media in the 21st century, Chinese netizens coined the expression 秀恩爱 (pinyin: xiù ēn'ài) for public display of affection. Literally translating to "to show off love and affection," the neologism quickly popularized and gained the connotation of "being lovey-dovey to piss off single people." According to a 2004 research by Weiyi Zhang, a researcher from Fudan University, the dissemination of PDA culture in China is largely ascribed to an ultramodern desire to gain public recognition and reality confirmation.

Mothers from the Manchu minority ethnic group, as only researched in the 1900s in Aigun of Northern Manchuria where the researcher S. M. Shirokogoroff personally believed the Manchu element were "purer" than those of Southern Manchuria and Peking, used to show affection for their children by performing fellatio on their male babies, placing the penis in their mouths and stimulating it, while they regarded public kissing with revulsion.

India
Public display of affection might be regarded as socially unacceptable in India if it disturbs others or creates nuisance. Same-sex physical contact is allowed. Under section 294 of the Indian Penal Code, causing annoyance to others through "obscene acts" is a criminal offense with a punishment of imprisonment up to 3 months or a fine, or both. For example, in 2007, when actor Richard Gere kissed Shilpa Shetty in an AIDS awareness event in New Delhi, a warrant for his arrest was issued by an Indian court, which was overturned by a higher court. However, the Supreme Court of India on various occasions have said that kissing or hugging between adults in public is legal. In the past, attacks by vigilante groups also were a danger for those celebrating Valentine's Day. However, the number of couples celebrating Valentine's Day has grown so much that these attacks have become ineffective in deterring couples.

Relaxation of previous generations' social norms has made public displays of affection more common among India's younger demographic. In the state of Kerala, a public hugging and kissing campaign (named Kiss Of Love) was launched in November 2014 in protest against moral policing. In the south Indian state of Kerala a sixteen-year-old boy was expelled from school for hugging a girl after she won a prize at an arts competition. When the Kerala State Commission for Protection of Child Rights ordered the school to re-enroll the boy, it was challenged in the High Court. The Court nullified the commission's order and upheld the school principal's order to expel the student, saying "The school principal is the institution’s guardian, vested with powers to take action necessary to maintain discipline and morality in the school. The child rights commission cannot interfere there."

Middle East
Middle Eastern countries such as Iraq, Saudi Arabia, Jordan and Egypt are predominantly Muslim cultures. Although public displays of affection generally do not fit the local culture and customs, it varies even among these countries. Decency laws do not allow public displays of affection. Penalties can be severe based on the action in different countries. Travelers to Dubai have been given jail sentences for kissing in public. In 2009 a British couple caught publicly kissing in Dubai were deported following a three-month prison sentence. An unmarried Indian couple, who were in a taxi, were sentenced to one year in prison for hugging and kissing. The taxi driver drove the couple directly to a police station. Kissing is considered "an offense to public decency".

In Iran, holding hands has become increasingly popular especially in big cities and among younger generations.

Islamic religious police prohibits public display of affection.

Adolescent

It is well recognized that relationships outside the family become increasingly important during adolescence. Although several studies of basic social processes have been conducted by sociologists, much of the research and theorizing about adolescent relationships has been carried out by developmental psychologists. Much more research has been done in the area of specific adolescent behaviors, which has shown that these behaviors are predicted well by relationship variables to include the display of affection.
 
Affection or intimacy references a pattern of conduct within relationships that includes subjective assessments of attachment. This pattern of conduct is a part of a larger constellation of factors that contributes to an adolescent's development of a non-parental relationship. A number of sociologists have explored the more general terrain of gender relations, although several of the key studies focus on preadolescence and early adolescence. Their work is important in highlighting the degree to which features of these early relations, and even intense personal feelings such as being in love, are socially constructed. Adolescents' conceptions about and conduct within these relationships are heavily influenced by interaction and communication with other girls or other boys. Specific rules emerge (e.g., one should always be in love, it is wrong to date more than one person) and gossip or other social sanctions serve as important sources of informal social control around these rules.
 
Research moves into the early adolescent period when youths are old enough to say they are going steady and is useful in actually characterizing the nature of these relationships. These liaisons are described as highly superficial and based on unrealistic idealised expectations. Furthermore, the desire of adolescents to put on a good "front" inhibits the development of intimacy. Going steady is a limiting factor on the adolescent social ritual.

This table below shows the quality and context of displays of affection in American adolescence among intra-racial couples:
 

Boys and girls begin the process of relating to one another, the transition is much easier for adolescent males, who essentially transport their dominant interaction styles (derived from peer interactions) into this new relationship form with the opposite sex. Public displays of affection may facilitate the demonstration of this dominant interaction style transference in a socially acceptable way.

Experimental research on communication processes observed in same- and mixed-gender groups to support this idea. Although behavior observed in cross-gender task groups is relevant, intimate dyadic relationships and task groups are not equivalent social contexts. Thus, an alternative hypothesis is that boys, who have less practice than their female counterparts with PDA (by virtue of their peer group experiences), must make a larger developmental leap as they move into the heterosexual arena. For example, examining the messages students write one another in high-school yearbooks, there were marked differences between boys' discourse directed toward friends (e.g., "you're a lousy wrestler…") and that directed toward romantic partners (e.g., "you are very beautiful in so many ways, it would take me a lifetime to express them in words…"). In contrast, young girls’ use of language in messages to close friends and boyfriends is more similar in form and content. To the degree that the romantic context provides their only opportunity to express themselves and, more broadly, to relate in this intimate fashion, young males can be considered more dependent on these relations than female adolescents, who have close friends for intimate talk and social support. This quality of uniqueness may figure into the etiology of more negative and sometimes gendered relational dynamics that also emerge in connection with romantic involvements stalking, intrusive control efforts, violence, and the like.

Interracial
Implicit or explicit attitudes towards interracial relationships strongly affect interpretations of public displays of affection within this context. These attitudes can be influenced by a plethora of factors, including social contact. For example, personal involvement and extended contact (media representations) with interracial and Black-White relationships has been linked to more positive perspectives regarding interracial relationships. Thus, personal experience and mere exposure to interracial couples tends to be related to more favorable attitudes. This finding supports the contact hypothesis, which states that interpersonal interactions between group members of each race will decrease prejudice and foster amicable connections between races. Beyond the conditions of equal group status, common goals, group cooperation, and social approval, some studies have found other stipulations important for fostering positive relations. For instance, it's important for the interracial contact to be intimate instead of superficial, for it to happen in many different settings, and for it to happen repeatedly with more than one individual from the other race.

Not everyone, especially those with learned biases and/or racist attitudes, is likely to be exposed to another race under these exact conditions; this lack of exposure to racial diversity will further perpetuate the internal cycle of unsubstantiated prejudice. In fact, the larger presence of African-Americans, Latinos and Asians in neighborhoods and religious congregations significantly predicts higher support from Caucasians for interracial marriages with these other races. Furthermore, it has been found that higher numbers of individuals from each of these racial groups in these social settings predict more interracial friendships. Therefore, it appears that reducing the socially imposed distance between one's in-group and out-group can result in developing more favorable attitudes towards romantic relationships between races. The problem still exists though that many people who have negative attitudes towards other races will avoid social settings where they may be exposed to other races due to ingrained stereotypes, opting instead to surround themselves with members of their in-group. In general, one study using survey data found that approximately half of African-American respondents versus about a quarter of Caucasian respondents approve of a close relative marrying an individual of the other race. 

Due to perceptions of others’ attitudes towards interracial relationships, many interracial couples may engage in certain behavioral strategies to reduce stigma and ostracism. Research shows that adolescent interracial couples tend to participate in fewer public and private activities than couples composed of individuals from the same race. Significant differences have been found between these two groups on holding hands in public, whereby interracial couples are less likely to do so, yet these differences do not maintain significance in the context of private displays of intimate affection. Therefore, it appears that the fear of being negatively judged in public inhibits interracial couples from displaying physical affection in comparison to couples of the same race. Interracial couples have also been found to engage in other strategies to deter potential judgment, including ignoring public harassment to avoid confrontation, staying at home or filtering their social group to increase acceptance, attending social gatherings attended only by other interracial couples, and publicly surrounding themselves with members of their social support network.

Same-sex

Public displays of affection between individuals of the same sex may or may not suggest homosexuality depending on the cultural context. For example, in many African cultures it is socially acceptable for people of the same sex to participate in public displays of affection, whereas in other countries such as the United States and Portugal, it is considered indicative of homosexuality. Public displays of affection tend to be determined largely by culture, which greatly influences perceptions of same-sex PDA.

Intolerance for homosexual PDA is commonplace in large swaths of society in many different cultures. For instance, in Portugal, LGBT individuals only act in ways that contend contemporary ideals and political/economic agendas. Homosexual individuals are less likely to partake in public displays of affection because their society is extremely critical of the act. They believe that by behaving according to what society deems appropriate, (e.g., only opposite-sex couples should partake in acts of public displays of affection), they are protecting themselves from being categorized as abnormal, odd, or deviant. Although same-sex marriage has been legal in Portugal since June 2010 (see Same-sex marriage in Portugal), LGBT people still refrain from public displays of affection for the most part. This detail may suggest that Portugal's acceptance of same-sex marriage is due to the fact that the LGBT individuals do not broadcast their sexuality, not that the public of Portugal is more accepting of these acts. Although it may appear that homosexual individuals are ambivalent about being limited in only displaying affection privately, it seems to happen out of fear of resentment or being perceived as odd rather than out of respect for their societies’ political beliefs and attitudes.

There have been many in-depth studies regarding societal attitudes towards homosexuality across many different factors. One study found that heterosexual people had higher negative attitudes towards homosexuals of their own sex, especially if they felt that they were being targets of sexual advances. They also found that men have less negative attitudes towards homosexual females than males whereas women tend to be more accepting overall of homosexuals and their role in society. In the contemporary Western society, attitudes towards same-sex public displays of affection vary city to city much like they vary country to country. Studies have shown that in populations where the majority of individuals have high cultural values and are more accommodating, same-sex or same-gender public displays of affection are more likely to occur. This is understandable because same-sex individuals feel less persecuted by others in society and are less likely to feel as though they are being categorized as odd, abnormal, or deviant like those in Portugal.
 
Of course, there are negative attitudes towards same-sex or same-gender public displays of affection as well. In a Colorado high school, two yearbook staff resigned after they were informed that they could not print the relationship page because it had a photo of two females holding hands. A spokesman for the New York City Gay and Lesbian Anti-Violence Project declared in 2007 that "people are still verbally harassed and physically attacked daily for engaging in simple displays of affection in public. Everything changes the minute we kiss".

Social media
Expression of a person's feelings towards someone else had previously been limited to written letters, phone calls, or in person. In the modern world, social media sites such as Facebook and Twitter are growing, with 1.7 billion users on Facebook and over half a billion Twitter users. Studies on relationships through Facebook found that, when two individuals who are interested in one another both use Facebook regularly, their relationship progresses in different increments than how it would without social media. After two people meet and form an interest, one or both individuals will go onto the other person's Facebook page and get information such as relationship status, pictures, and interests. Once a relationship begins, some couples broadcast their relationship with posts, such as pictures and changing the relationship status.

How people show their public displays of affection on social media sites can be indicative of relationship security and personality. Frequent and recent communication with a romantic partner through different forms of social media is an indicator of relational escalation, whereas limited communication has shown to be an indicator of alienation or relational de-escalation. Another study has shown that when someone focuses on relationship status and public displays of affection such as posting about activities with the significant other or his or her feelings towards them, that person tends to be more possessive or territorial over their partner.

A study found female characters on prime time television programs are significantly less likely to demonstrate physical affection if they had a larger body type than thinner female characters. Thus, even television producers act in a way as to intentionally limit public displays of affection based on the appearance of their actors, and that might affect viewership based on social disapproval. Regardless of television portrayals, the frequency and intensity of PDA has a tendency to depend upon the cultural context as well as perceived public perceptions of the couple, including their age group, racial composition, sexuality, and relationship centralized activity on social media.

Effects on romantic relationships

Various studies have found physical affection to be associated with positive outcomes in romantic relationships. For instance, it has been related to the formation of attachment bonds and psychological intimacy. Physical affection has been categorized into seven different types including holding hands, cuddling/holding, backrubs/massages, caressing/stroking, kissing the face and cheek, close hug, and kissing on the lips. Five of these behaviors, with the exception of caressing/stroking and holding hands, have been significantly positively associated with relationship and partner satisfaction.

Convention
In the United States, "get a room" is a phrase that is usually said when one feels a sense of disapproval after seeing what they consider to be an excessive public display of affection.

See also

Friendship
Indecent exposure
Interpersonal relationship
Intimacy
Intimate relationship
Norm (sociology)
Platonic love
Sex in public

References

Interpersonal attraction
Intimate relationships
Kissing
Display of affection